Pelican Products is an American multinational company that designs and manufactures portable lighting systems, temperature controlled packaging and protective cases. Their products are used in many industries including military, law enforcement, fire safety, and consumer entertainment. The company's flagship product, Pelican cases, are molded plastic cases that seal with an airtight and watertight gasket. Pelican is based in Torrance, California. In Europe the products are branded Peli.

History

The company was founded in Torrance, California in 1976 by David and Arline Parker as a mail-order home business. It was David Parker's desire to "develop unique and practical products for the dive market."

1976
The Pelican Dive Float is introduced
1978
The Pelican Protector case is introduced
1981 – 1984
The Pelican SabreLite introduced to the dive market 
Pelican products receive their first safety approvals
1989 – 1995
Molding operations brought in-house
Company moves to their Early Avenue, Torrance headquarters
1996 – 1999
Peli Products, S.A., their headquarters in Europe opens in Barcelona, Spain
The Pelican 1650 case is introduced
2000 – 2005
Pelican Products, ULC in Edmonton, Alberta, Canada opens
Pelican Micro Case series launches
Pelican receives ISO9000:2001 certification
First European Safety Approvals issued to Peli flashlights
A private equity investment firm, Behrman Capital, paid about $200 million for Pelican Products 
2006 – 2007
Behrman Capital announced that Lyndon J. Faulkner was named CEO 
The Pelican 7060 flashlight is introduced after being developed with the Los Angeles Police Department
 Pelican Japan and China open
Company surpasses 100 million in sales
Canadian Armed Forces contracts Pelican to build the special MOB "Mobile Operations Box" case
Their largest injection molding machine (code named "Colossus") is installed at the Torrance, CA plant
The Pelican i1010/i1030 Micro Case series is launched
Pelican's first robot (code named "T-Rex") is installed in their Torrance, CA plant
2008
Pelican Products purchased their largest Australian distributor and opened Pelican Australia 
Pelican Products makes Inc. Magazine's 5000 list for the second year
 The company purchased portable LED area lighting manufacturer Bluei UK 
General Peter Pace becomes Pelican's chairman of the board
The 9430 Remote Area Lighting System debuts
2009
 Pelican Products announced the acquisition of long-time competitor, Hardigg Industries of South Deerfield, Massachusetts, the world's largest manufacturer of rotationally molded protective cases 
Pelican lands an $80 million contract to create the General Mechanics Tool Kit for the U.S. Military
The Pelican 1090 HardBack case is introduced
2010
Pelican's chairman of the board, Peter Pace, initiates the Pelican For Patriots program, which provides cases for wounded military veterans to protect their prosthetic
Pelican sends coolers, flashlights and cases to aid in the Haiti disaster rescue and recovery
Pelican introduces Advanced Case Solutions line for custom case applications
Pelican is certified as a Sony Green Partner
Pelican introduces the 1460 EMS case for the emergency and fire safety markets
2011
Pelican purchased Australian roto-mold case manufacturer Trimcast 
Pelican India and South Korea open
Pelican wins the National Institute of Packaging Handling and Logistics Engineers (NIPHLE) 2011 Corporation of the Year award
Pelican receives the Presidential "E" award for exports
2013
 The company introduces their consumer division, offering backpacks, lighting tools, coolers and more
 The company acquired temperature-controlled container manufacturer Minnesota Thermal Science 
2014 – 2015
 Pelican introduces the Pelican 7000 flashlight, their first to shine up to 600 lumens
 Pelican introduces Pelican Elite luggage
 Pelican acquires Cool Logistics and re-brands the combined division (Minnesota Thermal Science + Cool Logistics) as Pelican BioThermal
2016 – 2017
 Pelican celebrates its 40th anniversary
Pelican introduces their Pelican Air Case line
Pelican introduces Pelican Traveler tumblers
 Peli BioThermal wins the Queen's Award for Innovation
2018 – 2019
 Peli BioThermal wins the Queen's Award for Enterprise
Pelican introduces the "Vault by Pelican" line as a brand extension to its case line
Pelican launches its first e-commerce site
2020
Pelican acquires NanoCool, a temperature-controlled packaging manufacturer.
Phil Gyori appointed the company's president and chief executive officer. Lyndon Faulkner becomes executive chairman.
2021
Platinum Equity completed the acquisition of Pelican.

See also
Maglite
Flashlight

References

Cooler manufacturers
Luggage manufacturers
Manufacturing companies established in 1976
Manufacturing companies based in Greater Los Angeles
1976 establishments in California
Privately held companies based in California
Private equity portfolio companies
Companies based in Torrance, California
Flashlights
2021 mergers and acquisitions